Acting President of the Quorum of the Twelve Apostles is a priesthood calling in the Church of Jesus Christ of Latter-day Saints (LDS Church).

Generally, the position of Acting President of the Quorum of the Twelve Apostles is filled when the President of the Quorum of the Twelve Apostles is called as a counselor in the First Presidency of the church. In such instances, the man who holds this calling is the most senior apostle who is not serving in the First Presidency. Additionally, a person may be called as the Acting President when the President of the Quorum is unable to perform his duties due to ill health or other incapacitation.

The formal calling of Acting President of the Quorum has been held seven times by six men: Rudger Clawson, Joseph Fielding Smith, Spencer W. Kimball, Howard W. Hunter, Boyd K. Packer, and M. Russell Ballard. Additionally, two earlier apostles—Orson Hyde and Brigham Young Jr.—have acted as President of the Quorum when they were not the second-most senior apostle in the church, and therefore may be said to have played the role of an Acting President of the Quorum before this specific title was created by the church.

Duties
As the Acting President of the Quorum, the person with this calling performs all of the duties that would normally be performed by the President of the Quorum. Primarily, these duties consist of presiding at and conducting the weekly meetings of the Quorum in the Salt Lake Temple; making decisions about the particular assignments to be made to the members of the Quorum; and acting as a liaison in coordinating the work of the Quorum with the First Presidency, the Quorums of the Seventy, and the Presiding Bishopric.

When adherents refer to the Acting President of the Quorum of the Twelve, his name is usually prefaced by the honorific title "President".

Six formal Acting Presidents in seven terms

Two "Acting Presidents" of the Quorum prior to the creation of the formal title
 
 Orson Hyde (27 December 1847 – 22 June 1868): When senior apostle Brigham Young became president of the church on 27 December 1847, the next senior apostle, Heber C. Kimball, was asked by Young to be one of the counselors in the First Presidency. This left Orson Hyde as the most senior member of the Quorum of the Twelve. According to current church practices, Kimball should have been called as president of the Quorum, with Hyde as acting president. However, this procedure was not followed, and Hyde was simply called as President of the Quorum. This created a historical anomaly whereby Hyde served as the President of the Quorum (not Acting President) while being the third most senior apostle until Kimball's death on 22 June 1868.
 Brigham Young, Jr. (9 December 1899 – 10 October 1901): was ordained an apostle in 1864, but was not appointed to the Quorum of the Twelve until 1868. When Lorenzo Snow became President of the Church in 1898, Brigham Young, Jr. was the most senior apostle based on date of ordination. However, in 1900, the First Presidency changed seniority in the Twelve to be based not on date of ordination, but on length of uninterrupted membership in that quorum. This placed George Q. Cannon and Joseph F. Smith ahead of Young in seniority. However, since Cannon and Smith were both members of the First Presidency, Young continued serving as President of the Twelve.Following today's procedure, Cannon would have served as quorum president until his death, followed by Smith until his call as President of the Church; with Young as Acting President during both tenures. Instead, Young remained President of the Twelve until Snow died in 1901. At that time, Smith briefly became President of the Twelve before being set apart as President of the Church. Since this left Young as the most senior member of the Twelve, he was reinstated as its president.

References

Latter Day Saint hierarchy
Leadership positions in the Church of Jesus Christ of Latter-day Saints
Acting President
Quorum of the Twelve Apostles (LDS Church)
Presidents in the Church of Jesus Christ of Latter-day Saints